Antoine Laurain is a French writer born in Paris in 1972.

His first novel, The Portrait [Ailleurs si j'y suis] won the Drouot Prize in 2007, and was followed by Smoking Kills [Fume et tue] (2008) and Carrefour des Nostalgies  (2009). In 2012 The President’s Hat [Le Chapeau de Mitterrand] would be one of the years great successes. The novel won the Landerneau prize for emerging writers and the Relay travel prize. Translated into 17 languages and published in English by Gallic Books, in 2013 it became one of the highest selling French books in translation. Antoine Laurain participated in a US tour for The President’s Hat at the invitation of American independent bookshops. The tour lasted fifteen days, during which time he visited ten cities.

In 2015 The President’s Hat was adapted for television (France 2) with Frédéric Diefenthal, Michel Leeb, Frédérique Bell and Roland Giraud (directed by Robin Davis, music by Vladimir Cosma).

The Red Notebook [La femme au carnet rouge] was published in 2014 and was translated into 22 languages, under the German title of Liebe mit zwei Unbekannten (Hoffmann und Campe), and the Italian title of La donna dal taccuino rosso (Einaudi). The cinematic rights were sold to UGC.

In 2016, the German translation of The Red Notebook made the Spiegel bestseller list, and the German translation of The President’s Hat became the eighth-highest selling book in Germany that year. French Rhapsody [Rhapsodie française] was published the same year by Flammarion. Antoine Laurain returned to the US for the French Rhapsody tour, which consisted of six cities in nine days, and which confirmed the popularity of his books beyond the French borders.

On the 11th of April 2020, Camilla Parker Bowles, the Duchess of Cornwall and wife of Prince Charles, published a list of nine books she recommended for reading during the COVID-19 lockdown on her Instagram account. Only one French title appeared: The Red Notebook by Antoine Laurain. The list would reach the whole world.

The Duchess of Cornwall's list:

Restless by William Boyd

A Tale Of Two Cities by Charles Dickens

The Simon Serrailler series by Susan Hill

The Secret Commonwealth by Philip Pullman

The Cazalet Chronicles by Elizabeth Jane Howard

A Gentleman In Moscow by Amor Towles

The Red Notebook by Antoine Laurain

The Architect's Apprentice by Elif Shafak

Travels On My Elephant by Mark Shand

Selected works
 La femme au carnet rouge, translation: The Red Notebook, by Jane Aitken and Emily Boyce
 Le Chapeau de Mitterrand, translation: The President's Hat, by Louise Rogers Lalaurie, Jane Aitken and Emily Boyce
 Rhapsodie française, translation: French Rhapsody, by Jane Aitken and Emily Boyce
 Ailleurs si j'y suis, translation: The Portrait, by Jane Aitken and Emily Boyce
 Fume et tue, translation: Smoking Kills, by Louise Rogers Lalaurie
 Millésime 1954, translation: Vintage 1954, by Jane Aitken and Emily Boyce
 Le Service des manuscrits, translation: The Reader’s Room by Jane Aitken, Emily Boyce and Polly Mackintosh
 Et mon cœur se serra, in collaboration with Le Sonneur, translation: Red is My Heart by Jane Aitken

References

French novelists
1972 births
Living people